Amity Hall was a ship launched on the River Thames in 1789. She was a West Indiaman of little note until 1793 when she struck the slave ship , leading Albions crew to abandon her. This gave rise to an important court case in which the judge ruled that Amity Halls owners were responsible for her captain's actions and so liable for the loss of Albion. Amity Hall herself was wrecked the next year.

Background
Amity Hall first appears in Lloyd's Register in 1789 with G. Young, master, G. Tarbutt, owner, and trade London–Jamaica. Amity Hall was probably named for Amity Hall plantation, an important sugar estate in Vere Parish, Jamaica. The ship herself was at least the second vessel by that name that Tarbutt had owned. Young had been captain of the  previous Amity Hall when she was lost in 1788.

Amity Hall made three voyages to London. The dates of her arrival in London are: 

In 1793 Amity Halls master was still G. Young and her owner was still G. Tarbutt.

Accident and court case
On 4 July a gale forced Amity Hall away from the fleet, but she sighted it on 5 July.

As Amity Hall was rejoining the fleet on 6 July she collided with Albion. The collision took place off Cape San Antonio, Cuba. Amity Hall rescued Albions master and crew, who abandoned Albion.

Amity Hall arrived at London on 12 August and cleared on 10 October.

Albions owners sued the owners of Amity Hall, arguing that the accident was the consequence of Amity Hall not following the sailing instructions for the fleet that Commodore Alms, of Proserpine, had issued. The Court found for Albions owners. The case still appeared in a book of ruling cases over 100 years later.

Loss
The Royal Gazette, Kingston Jamaica, mentioned on 19 July 1794 that Amity Hall, Blackburn, had a few days earlier drifted on to rocks when the wind failed as she was sailing out of Manchioneal harbour. The newspaper reported that it was feared that Amity Hall and her cargo would be lost. Lloyd's List later reported that she had been lost on 10 July.

Notes

Citations

References
Campbell, Robert and Irving Browne (1916) English Ruling Cases, Vol. 1, Abandonment - Action. "Mitchell vs. Tarbutt". (Rochester, NY: Lawyers Cooperative Publishing Co.)
Fletcher, Charles, M.D., (1805) The naval guardian.
Reports of Committees of the House of Commons Vol. 14 (1893-1802), (1803).

1789 ships
Age of Sail merchant ships of England
Maritime incidents in 1793
Maritime incidents in 1794